Koprivnica Synagogue is a former synagogue in Koprivnica, Croatia.

In 1869, around a hundred Jews lived in Koprivnica. Although relatively small, the Jewish community of Koprivnica funded the construction of the Koprivnica Synagogue. It was designed by Hönigsberg & Deutsch and built in 1875 together with a Jewish school alongside. Its location, in the center of Koprivnica, for that time was more than prestige. In 1937, the synagogue was thoroughly remodeled by architect Slavko Löwy. During World War II, the synagogue was devastated and turned into a prison. The organ and some other items from the synagogue were saved and are now preserved at the Koprivnica Museum. The Jewish community of Koprivnica suffered terrible devastation during the war as most of the Jews of Koprivnica and the surrounding villages perished during the Holocaust. The last rabbi of Koprivnica's Jewish community was Izrael Kohn who was killed in a concentration camp. Koprivnica Synagogue is one of a few synagogues in Croatia that remained standing after the war. Under the communist regime of SFR Yugoslavia the synagogue was used mainly for a business purposes, with a tailoring firm and a warehouse. Although small, a Jewish community still exists in Koprivnica. In 2011, restoration of the Koprivnica Synagogue began and it was listed as a cultural monument.

References

Ashkenazi Jewish culture in Croatia
Ashkenazi synagogues
Synagogues completed in 1875
Former synagogues in Croatia
Koprivnica
Buildings and structures in Koprivnica-Križevci County